Begunah() is a 1957 Indian family entertainment romance film produced by Anupchand Shah and Mahipatray Shah. The film directed by Narendra Suri in hindi language under the  Rup Kamal Chitra company. The film was released on 8 March 1957.

Releasing Issue
The film was banned 10 days after its release because it was a plagiarized version of American film Knock on Wood (1954, starring Danny Kaye, Mai Zetterling). The producers of Knock on the Wood filed a copyright lawsuit in India. They won the case and the judge ordered all prints of Begunah to be destroyed. Therefore, no known prints of this film exist anymore. However, the songs especially Mukesh number "Aye Pyase dil Bezuban" picturized on music director Jaikishan became quite popular and is still heard today.
Two other songs worth a mention are the comic Kishore Kumar “ Aaj na Jane pagal manwa kahe ghabraye” and the Manna Dey and Lata Mangeshkar duet “Dil albela pyar ka mausam”

Cast
 Kishore Kumar
 Shakila 
 Helen
 Jaikishan Dayabhai Panchal
 Raja Nene
 David Abraham

Soundtrack

References

External links
 

1957 films
1950s Hindi-language films
1957 drama films
Indian black-and-white films
Indian drama films
Hindi-language drama films